Edmund Leroy Kagy (April 21, 1889 – November 16, 1960) was a professional American football player in the Ohio League, which was the direct predecessor to the modern National Football League, from 1912 until 1915. During that time he played with the Shelby Blues, Elyria Athletics, Akron Indians and the Massillon Tigers. He won championships with Elyria, in 1914, and Akron in 1913 and 1914.

Prior to his professional career, Kagy played college level at Western Reserve, now known as Case Western Reserve University, from 1908 to 1910.  In 1917 he played for the Camp Sherman Football Team. He played for the team on November 29, 1917, in a 28–0 loss to the Ohio State Buckeyes.  On April 18, 1980, Kagy was inducted into Case's varsity sports hall of fame.
Kagy coached Western Reserve's basketball team for two seasons spanning from 1911 to 1913, and Western Reserve's baseball team during the 1912 season.  Kagy was also an assistant football coach in 1911.

In 1912, Kagy co-founded Gyro International, where he remained involved until he retired in 1953.  He was enduringly known within the organization as the "Grey Eagle.”  He resided in Chagrin Falls, OH much of his adult life.

References

External links
Camp Sherman vs. Ohio State Nov. 29, 1917 game program

1889 births
1960 deaths
American football halfbacks
Akron Indians (Ohio League) players
Case Western Spartans football coaches
Case Western Spartans football players
Case Western Spartans baseball coaches
Case Western Spartans men's basketball coaches
Elyria Athletics players
Massillon Tigers players
Shelby Blues players
People from Cleveland Heights, Ohio
People from Chagrin Falls, Ohio